was the second son of Tsukushi Korekado and warlord/kokujin of Chikuzen. During the year of 1567, Hirokado was defeated by an Ōtomo officer by the name of Takahashi Jōun. Also surrendering to Ryūzōji Takanobu during the year of 1572. When the latter invaded Kyūshū in 1587, Hirokado joined up under the likes of Toyotomi Hideyoshi.

As a result of joining Hideyoshi, Hirokado was completely restored of his domain at Chikuzen. Hirokado served under Kobayakawa Takakage during the Korean Campaigns. During the Battle of Sekigahara, Hirokado joined up the western forces, fighting at the Ōtsu Castle. Afterwards Hirokado was deprived of his domain, but became an honored retainer under the likes of Katō Kiyomasa.

Daimyo
People of the Japanese invasions of Korea (1592–1598)
1548 births
1615 deaths